Banting Bridge is a major landmark in Banting, Selangor, Malaysia The bridge connects Banting in the west to Telok Datok in the east.

Bridges in Selangor
Kuala Langat District